The Albert Goldthorpe Medal is an award that has been created by Rugby Leaguer & League Express to honour the leading players in the Super League and to honour Albert Goldthorpe, who was English rugby league's first superstar at the turn of the 20th century.

The Albert Goldthorpe Medal is a solid gold medal worth several thousand UK pounds, incorporating a photograph of Goldthorpe with "All Four Cups".

The award was introduced in the 2008 season to commemorate the centenary of the feat of Goldthorpe in leading Hunslet to become the first club to win all four major trophies in one season in 1908.

It is intended to parallel the 'Dally M Medal' named after the great Australian player Dally Messenger, which is awarded to the NRL player of the year by rugby league writers associated with the News Limited series of newspapers in Australia.

League Express reporters will cast votes for the Albert Goldthorpe Medal after every Super League game in the regular season. The three players who, in the opinion of the reporter, have been the three 'best and fairest' players in the game will receive three points, two points and one point respectively. To be eligible for a vote, a player must not have been suspended from the competition at any stage during the season.

Winners

References

External links
Points table for Albert Goldthorpe Medal
The Albert Goldthorpe Medal at totalrl.com

Rugby league trophies and awards
Rugby league in the United Kingdom
Super League